Bloody Sunday is a 2002 Irish film written and directed by Paul Greengrass based around the 1972 "Bloody Sunday" shootings in Derry, Northern Ireland. Although produced by Granada Television as a TV film, it premiered at the Sundance Film Festival on 16 January, a few days before its screening on ITV on 20 January, and then in selected London cinemas from 25 January.

Content
The film was inspired by Don Mullan's politically influential book Eyewitness Bloody Sunday (Wolfhound Press, 1997). The drama shows the events of the day through the eyes of Ivan Cooper, an SDLP Member of the Parliament of Northern Ireland who was a central organiser of the Northern Ireland Civil Rights Association march in Derry on 30 January 1972. The march ended when British Army paratroopers fired on the demonstrators, killing thirteen and wounding another who died four and a half months later. In addition to the deaths, fourteen other people were wounded.

A live version of "Sunday Bloody Sunday" by U2 plays over the closing credits.

Casting and production
Cooper is played by James Nesbitt, himself a Protestant from Northern Ireland. In recognition of the role his book played in achieving the new Bloody Sunday Inquiry, his book's role as inspiration for the movie, and the fact that he was a schoolboy witness to the tragedy, Don Mullan was asked by director Paul Greengrass to appear in the film as a Bogside Priest. A number of the military characters were played by ex-members of the British Army, including Simon Mann. Gerry Donaghy was played by Declan Duddy, nephew of Jackie Duddy, one of those killed on Bloody Sunday. Big Brother 2007 housemate Seány O'Kane was also in the film.

Notable actors
James Nesbitt as Ivan Cooper
Tim Pigott-Smith as Major General Robert Ford
Nicholas Farrell as Brigadier Patrick Maclellan
Gerard McSorley as Chief Supt. Lagan
Kathy Kiera Clarke as Frances
Allan Gildea as Kevin McCorry
Gerard Crossan as Eamonn McCann
Simon Mann as Col Derek Wilford
Mary Moulds as Bernadette Devlin
Carmel McCallion as Bridget Bond
David Clayton Rogers as Dennis

Reception
The film was critically acclaimed. It won the Audience Award at Sundance and the Golden Bear at the Berlin International Film Festival (tied with Spirited Away), in addition to the Hitchcock d'Or best film prize at the Dinard Festival of British Cinema.

Bloody Sunday appeared a week before Jimmy McGovern's TV film on the same subject, entitled Sunday (shown by Channel 4). McGovern subsequently criticised Greengrass's film for concentrating on the leadership of the march, and not the perspective of those who joined it.

It holds a 92% approval rating on aggregate review site Rotten Tomatoes, based on 102 collected reviews, with an average score of 7.9/10. The site's consensus reads: "Bloody Sunday powerfully recreates the events of that day with startling immediacy."  Metacritic, which uses a weighted average, assigned the film a score of 90 out of 100 based on 31 critics, indicating "universal acclaim."

In 2003, it won the British Academy Television Craft Award for Best Sound: Fiction.

References

Further reading

External links

2002 drama films
2002 films
2002 television films
British docudrama films
English-language Irish films
English-language television shows
Films about The Troubles (Northern Ireland)
Films directed by Paul Greengrass
Films set in Northern Ireland
Films shot in Ireland
Golden Bear winners
Irish television films
ITV television dramas
Northern Irish films
Paramount Vantage films
Television shows produced by Granada Television
2000s English-language films
2000s British films
British drama television films